Ura Rigana Kwalu (born 24 June 1976) is a former Papua New Guinean woman cricketer. She played for Papua New Guinea in the 2008 Women's Cricket World Cup Qualifier.

References

External links 

1976 births
Living people
Papua New Guinean women cricketers